Robert Shaw (died 1527) was a Scottish Cluniac monk and prelate. A son of the Laird of Sauchie, he became a monk at Paisley Abbey. He was provided as Abbot of Paisley after the resignation of Abbot George Shaw on 20 July 1498. As abbot, he took an active if unimportant role in national affairs, appearing many times as a witness to royal charters. On 11 January 1525, he was given crown nomination to Pope Clement VII to succeed James Hepburn as Bishop of Moray. The nomination was agreeable with the papacy and on 17 May he was provided to the see.  He held the diocese of Moray for only two years, serving once on a diplomatic mission to England. He died sometime before November 1527.

References
 Dowden, John, The Bishops of Scotland, ed. J. Maitland Thomson, (Glasgow, 1912)
 Keith, Robert, An Historical Catalogue of the Scottish Bishops: Down to the Year 1688, (London, 1924)
 Watt, D.E.R., Fasti Ecclesiae Scotinanae Medii Aevi ad annum 1638, 2nd Draft, (St Andrews, 1969)
 Watt, D.E.R. & Shead, N.F. (eds.), The Heads of Religious Houses in Scotland from the 12th to the 16th Centuries, The Scottish Records Society, New Series, Volume 24, (Edinburgh, 2001)

1527 deaths
Bishops of Moray
Cluniacs
Scottish abbots
Year of birth missing
15th-century Scottish clergy
16th-century Scottish Roman Catholic bishops